Glen Alan Chadwick (born 17 October 1976) is a cyclist with both New Zealand and Australian citizenship.

Career
In 1998 Chadwick helped fellow kiwi Nathan Dahlberg setup the Marco Polo Cycling Team team. Glen Chadwick began his career in 2001 at the Belgian cycling team Landbouwkrediet–Colnago. In his first year, he came second in the general classification of the Tour de Liège. After two years he moved to Taiwan to ride for the Giant Asia Racing Team. Here he would win in his first year the Tour of Korea and the Tour of Beijing. In 2005 he rode for the Australian UCI Continental team Cyclingnews.com. After two years (2006, 2007) at the American UCI Professional Continental team Navigators Insurance he moved to Team Type 1 in 2008. During 2008 he won the Overall at the Vuelta Mexico Telmex. In 2009 he joined  Rock Racing. Chadwick was part of the team sent to race the road race at the 2008 Summer Olympics.

Major results

2000
 1st  Overall Tour of Tasmania
1st Stage 4
 6th Overall Commonwealth Bank Classic
1st Stage 10
2001
 4th Memorial Philippe Van Coningsloo
 10th Grote Prijs Stad Sint-Niklaas
2002
 1st Stage 4 Tour of South China Sea
 2nd Overall Tour of Qinghai Lake
 9th Overall Tour de Serbia
2003
 1st  Overall Tour de Korea
1st Stage 3
 3rd Giro d'Oro
 4th Grote 1-MeiPrijs
 8th Overall International Tour of Hellas
2005
 1st Tour du Jura
 2nd Internationale Wielertrofee Jong Maar Moedig
 3rd Overall Tour de Hongrie
1st Stage 5
 6th Overall Tour de Beauce
2006
 2nd Overall Tour of Utah
 4th Overall Cascade Cycling Classic
2007
 National Championships
1st  Time trial
5th Road race
 Tour de Beauce
 1st Stages 2 & 3
2008
 1st  Overall Vuelta Mexico Telmex
 3rd Overall Tour of Utah
 5th Overall Tour de Beauce
1st  Mountains classification
 6th Overall Herald Sun Tour
 7th Overall Tour of Southland
2009
 1st Stage 13 Vuelta a Colombia
 5th Overall Vuelta Mexico Telmex
 6th Overall Tour of Southland
 7th Overall Vuelta Asturias
1st Stage 1
2010
 8th Overall Tour of the Gila
 10th Overall Tour of Southland
 10th Overall Cascade Cycling Classic

References

External links

 

1976 births
Living people
New Zealand male cyclists
People from Ōpunake